Electro-Acústico (Portuguese for "Electro-Acoustic") is a compilation album by Brazilian rock band Zero. Their first release in 13 years since the studio album Carne Humana, it came out in 2000 by Sony Music Entertainment. It is a compilation of electronic-influenced acoustic re-recordings of some of the band's old songs, particularly ranging from their 1985 EP Passos no Escuro to Carne Humana, plus four previously unreleased tracks. The album counts with guest appearances by Philippe Seabra of Plebe Rude and Bruno Gouveia of Biquini Cavadão.

"Em Volta do Sol", "Mentiras" and "Dedicatória" would be eventually re-recorded for Zero's second studio album, Quinto Elemento, released in 2007.

Track listing

Personnel
 Guilherme Isnard – vocals
 Eduardo Amarante – guitar
 Alfred "Freddy" Haiat – keyboards
 Ricardo "Rick" Villas-Boas – bass
 Sérgio Naciffe – drums
 João Paulo "JP" Mendonça – keyboards, production
 Philippe Seabra – guitar (on track 5)
 Bruno Gouveia – backing vocals (on tracks 4 and 5)

References

External links
 Electro-Acústico at Discogs

2000 compilation albums
Zero (Brazilian band) albums
Sony Music compilation albums